Luv Randhawa (born 1973) is a Canadian-British singer based in Vancouver, British Columbia. Luv is known for his debut mainstream album entitled Believe In Me which Hit #2 on iTunes R&B/ soul charts. He also known for his solo album This Side of Luv, which was released in 2011. According to CKYE-FM, Luv is the pioneer of the Bhangra Fusion Movement in the western hemisphere.

Career
Luv born in London in 1973. Luv won the Best International Artist in 2020, from the UK Bhangra Awards and has been recognized, by both Provincial & Federal Governments for his contribution in Multiculturalism & Diversity in Music & Arts for Canada. 

UrbanAsian reported, in 2003, "Luv participated ZeeTV International Bhangra Awards along with his musical group Signia". Later Luv released his first album "Yours For The Taking" in 2004. Luv collaborated with Nick Chowlia to make the album "Dhol Te" which was featured in Mumbai Mirror. Luv also performed in Sawan Mela that celebrated South Asian culture and community in Vancouver.

Discography

References

External links 

 

1973 births
Canadian male singer-songwriters
Canadian singer-songwriters
Living people
Musicians from London